Săcălășeni is a commune in Maramureș County, Romania. It is made up of three villages: Coruia (Karuly), Culcea (Kővárkölcse) and Săcălășeni. From 1968 to 2004, it also included four other villages. These were then split off to recreate Coaș and Coltău Communes.

References

Communes in Maramureș County